Glyptolenus is a genus of beetles in the family Carabidae, containing the following species:

 Glyptolenus aereipennis (Chaudoir, 1850)
 Glyptolenus affinis (Chaudoir, 1879)
 Glyptolenus apicestriatus (Reiche, 1843)
 Glyptolenus ater (Chaudoir, 1859)
 Glyptolenus brevitarsis (Chaudoir, 1879)
 Glyptolenus chalybeus Dejean, 1831
 Glyptolenus convexiusculus (Chaudoir, 1879)
 Glyptolenus estebanensis Perrault, 1992
 Glyptolenus janthinus (Dejean, 1831)
 Glyptolenus latelytra (Darlington, 1935)
 Glyptolenus latitarsis Bates, 1884
 Glyptolenus mirabilis (Straneo, 1991)
 Glyptolenus negrei Perrault, 1991
 Glyptolenus nigrita (Chaudoir, 1879)
 Glyptolenus nitidipennis (Chaudoir, 1850)
 Glyptolenus rivalis (Chaudoir, 1879)
 Glyptolenus ruficollis (Chaudoir, 1879)
 Glyptolenus rugicollis Bates, 1878
 Glyptolenus simplicicollis Darlington, 1934
 Glyptolenus smithi Liebherr, 1997
 Glyptolenus spinosus (Reiche, 1843)
 Glyptolenus straneoi Will & Liebherr, 2002
 Glyptolenus transformatus Bates, 1882

References

Platyninae